A Guide to Grand-Jury Men — in full, A Guide to Grand Jury Men, Divided in two books. In the first, is the Author's best advice to them what to do, before they bring in a Billa vera in cases of Witchcraft, with a Christian Direction to such as are too much given upon every cross to think themselves bewitched. In the Second, is a Treatise touching Witches good and bad, how they may be known, evicted, condemned, with many particulars tending thereunto was first published in 1627 and written by a puritan clergyman named Richard Bernard.

The work is a collection of two dissertations on the legal aspects of witchcraft and how those participating in the trials may be deceived by deceit and counterfeited accounts. It further elaborates on how many natural ills can be taken as bewitchment. Bernard gives advice on how to determine an actual account of witchcraft from that of a false accusation and even more, the signs one should seek to determine if a man is truly bewitched or suffering from a natural sickness.

The dissertation was written to help reform the laws on witchcraft, to educate the men commissioned to seek out, investigate and prosecute instances of witchcraft, and as a guide to witchfinding with a combination of scientific analysis and theological understanding that was not previously used. Previously, the Justices of Peace did not always expect direct evidence, and seeing that the works of witches were works of darkness, there were often no witnesses present with them to accuse them.

Book One
The first book covers a wide range of topics but focuses on some key points. The first is the scientific aspect to witchcraft. That strange diseases can happen to both men and animals that are neither inflicted by devils or witches. There were many who were falsely accused of witchcraft based on their natural ailments, but it was Richard Bernard's belief that men were also able to counterfeit various claims of bewitchment for their own financial, social or political purpose  and that if the devil were involved, he could work without the consent or association of a witch.

Book Two
The second book delves into the study of demonology and the theology of witchcraft, and works to prove through theological study what witches are real  and how a witch is said to enlist a spirit to conduct mischief and bewitch others. Bernard explains the behavioral characteristics of an individual most likely to become a witch and how the Devil solicits an individual and prepares them to partake in the practices of witchcraft and deceit. 

Bernard felt that a person who goes to a witch, wizard, or blesser for assistance is just as guilty of witchcraft in the biblical perspective. There are also elaborations on the following topics:
 The sealing and confirmation of a contract with the devil and the various kinds of individuals that may establish such a pact
 The shapes and appearances which Satan may take
 How a Christian may be overtaken and yielded by witchcraft
 The differences between a good witch and a bad witch
 The various occupations a witch may take
 That many rituals and preparations must be made before anything can be bewitched
 The manner and methods of examining a witch
 The difficulties in discovering a witch and the causes of those difficulties
 The political reasons for executing witches
 How trials of bad witches should be conducted and rules for the persecution, conviction and condemnation of witches in the course of justice.

See also
 Martha Brossier
 Daemonologie
 Necromancy
 Witch-hunt

References

Further reading
 

1627 books
1629 books
Demonological literature
Magic (supernatural)
Occult books
Witchcraft in England
Witchcraft treatises
Witch hunter manuals